Lake Vermilion or Vermilion Lake may refer to:

Canada
Vermilion Lakes, a series of lakes in Alberta, Canada
Vermilion Lake (Sudbury), a lake near Sudbury, Canada
Vermilion Lake (Temagami), a lake near Temagami, Canada
United States
Lake Vermilion (Illinois), a reservoir in Illinois county, United States
Lake Vermilion, a lake in St. Louis County, Minnesota
Vermilion Lake Township, St. Louis County, Minnesota

See also 
Lake Vermillion (disambiguation)
Vermilion (disambiguation)